Donald Munro may refer to:

 Donald Munro of Foulis (died 1039), first traditional chief of the Clan Munro
 Donald W. Munro (1916–1998), Progressive Conservative party member of the Canadian House of Commons
 Donald B. Munro (died 1984), Ontario mayor
 Donald L. Munro, American politician from Pennsylvania
 Donald Munro (New Brunswick politician) (1885–?), member of the Legislative Assembly of New Brunswick and Mayor of Woodstock, New Brunswick
 Donnie Munro (born 1953), Scottish musician
 Don Munro (Australian footballer) (1891–1954), Australian rules footballer for Fitzroy
 Donald Munro (moderator) (1860–1937), Moderator of the General Assembly of the Free Church of Scotland in 1918

See also
Donald Monro (disambiguation)
Donald Monroe, author